Zanola verago is a moth in the family Apatelodidae. It was described by Pieter Cramer in 1777. It is found in Venezuela and Suriname.

References

Apatelodidae
Moths described in 1777
Taxa named by Pieter Cramer
Moths of South America